The Suffrage Science award is a prize for women in science, engineering and computing founded in 2011, on the 100th anniversary of International Women's Day by the MRC London Institute of Medical Sciences (LMS). There are three categories of award: 
 life sciences
 engineering and physical sciences
 mathematics and computing.

The life sciences award was founded in 2011. Every year there are 10 laureates from research backgrounds and one laureate for communication. The engineering and physical sciences award was founded in 2013. Every year there are 12 laureates from areas spanning physics, chemistry and more. The math and computing award was launched on Ada Lovelace Day, 2016. Every year there are five laureates from mathematics, five laureates from computing and one laureate for science communication and the public awareness of science.

Laureates
Laureates have included:

2021 
Engineering and Physical Sciences winners are:

 , European Space Agency, The Netherlands
 Syma Khalid, University of Southampton, UK
 Natalie Stingelin, Georgia Institute of Technology, USA
 , Leiden University, The Netherlands
 Hayaatun Sillem, CBE, Royal Academy of Engineering, UK
 Ruth Cameron, University of Cambridge, UK
 , Swedish University of Agricultural Sciences, Sweden
 , Centro Andaluz de Biología del Desarrollo, Spain
 Samaya Nissanke, University of Amsterdam and Nikhef, The Netherlands
 Gerjo van Osch, Erasmus University Medical Center, The Netherlands
 Valérie Orsat, McGill University, Canada
 Mary Anti Chama, University of Ghana, Ghana

2020

Life Sciences award winners are:

 , MRC Laboratory of Molecular Biology
 , University of Toronto, Canada
 Elspeth Garman, University of Oxford, UK
 Veronique Miron, University of Edinburgh, UK
 , I-STEM, France
 Zena Werb, University of California, San Francisco, USA
 Samantha Joye, University of Georgia, USA
 Gisou van der Goot, EPFL Lausanne, Switzerland
 Karalyn Patterson, University of Cambridge, UK
 , University of Texas Austin, USA
  Claudia Mazzà, University of Sheffield, UK

Maths and Computing award winners are:

 , Cardiff University
 , Lancaster University, UK, and ENSIIE, France
 Apala Majumdar, University of Strathclyde
 , University College London
 Sara Lombardo, Loughborough University
 Wendy Mackay, Inria, Paris-Saclay, France
 Yvonne Rogers, University College London
 Alexandra Silva, University College London
 Nobuko Yoshida, Imperial College London
 Sue Sentance, King’s College London Raspberry Pi Foundation
 Anne-Marie Imafidon, STEMettes

2019

Engineering and Physical Sciences
 Moira Jardine
 Sarah Harris
 Róisín Owens
 Tiny de Keuster Universiteit Gent
 Karen Holford 
 Serena Best
 Tara Garnett
 Isabel Palacios
 Amina Helmi
 Sue Kimber
 Marzieh Moosavi-Nasab
 Melinda Duer

2018

Life sciences:
 Cathy Price
 
 Claire Rougeulle
 Denise Head
 Jenny Martin
 Anna Wu
 Mikala Egeblad
 
 Anat Mirelman
Elizabeth Bradbury
 Susan M. Gaines	

Maths and Computing
 
 Tereza Neocleous
 Nina Snaith
 Daniela De Angelis
 Eugenie Hunsicker
 Sally Fincher
 Julie McCann
 Jane Hillston
 Ursula Martin
 Hannah Dee
 Vicky Neale

2017

Engineering
 Lyndsay Fletcher
 
 Rylie Green
 
 Sheila Rowan
 Cathy Holt
 
 Marta Vicente-Crespo
 Marileen Dogterom
 Sheila MacNeil
 Zohreh Azimifar
 Sharon Ashbrook

2016

Life sciences:
 Kia Nobre
 Lori Passmore
 Déborah Bourc'his
 Uraina Clark
 Michelle James
 
 Corinne Houart
 Sally John
 Catherina Becker
 Pippa Goldschmidt

Maths and computing:

 Christl Donnelly 
 Jane Hutton
 Frances Kirwan
 Sylvia Richardson
 Gwyneth Stallard
 Ann Blandford
 Muffy Calder
 Leslie Ann Goldberg
 Wendy Hall
 
 Celia Hoyles 
 Shafi Goldwasser
 Marta Kwiatkowska 
 Emma McCoy

2015

 Lucie Green
 
 
 Susan Condor , Loughborough
 Anne Neville 
 Ruth Wilcox, Leeds
  London School of Hygiene & Tropical Medicine (LSHTM)
  University of Bath
 , Curie institute
 Alicia El Haj
 Tamsin Edwards
 Polly Arnold

2014

 Irene Tracey
 Shannon Au
 Anne Ferguson-Smith
 Xiaomeng Xu
 Jane Endicott
 Sarah Bohndiek
 
 Kate Storey
 Eleftheria Zeggini
 
 Jennifer Rohn

2013

 Julia Higgins
 Molly Stevens
 Lesley Yellowlees
 Eileen Ingham
 Jennifer Nichols 
 Sally Macintyre
 Susan Gathercole
 Clare Elwell
 Petra Schwille
 Maggie Aderin-Pocock
 Kathy Sykes

2012

 Emily Holmes
 Tracey Barett
 Nicole Soranzo
 Bianca Acevedo
 Francoise Barre-Sinoussi
 Elizabeth Murchison
 Edith Heard
 Marysia Placzek
 Sarah Teichmann
 Christiana Ruhrberg

2011

 Sarah-Jayne Blakemore
 Mary Collins
 Sally Davies
 Helen Fisher
 Vivienne Parry
 Sohaila Rastan
 Elizabeth Robertson
 Janet Thornton
 Fiona Watt
 Brenda Maddox

References

Women in science and technology
Academic awards
Computer-related awards
Mathematics awards
Science awards honoring women